Linnie Taylor Marchant Findlay (April 22, 1919 – January 10, 2009) was a writer-historian based in Ephraim, Utah. A native of Ioka, Utah, she is cited as a founding editor of the Saga of the Sanpitch, an annually-published collection of historical short-stories about Scandinavian immigrants and their descendants in Utah's Sanpete Valley.  She and her husband, a professor at Snow College, were among the original organizers of the Mormon Miracle Pageant. Findlay was a Latter Day Saint.

Publications

References

External links 
 Saga of the Sanpitch
 Obituary of Ross Findlay, Linnie's husband

1919 births
2009 deaths
Latter Day Saints from Utah
People from Ephraim, Utah
Writers from Utah